Anton Rukavina  (born 6 May 1985) is a Croatian retired football player who last played as a midfielder for NK Opatija.

Career
Rukavina previously spent five seasons playing for NK Pomorac in the Croatian Druga HNL and played for KF Skënderbeu Korçë and KS Kastrioti in Albanian Superliga.

References

External links
 

1985 births
Living people
Footballers from Rijeka
Association football midfielders
Croatian footballers
NK Pomorac 1921 players
KF Skënderbeu Korçë players
KS Kastrioti players
HNK Rijeka players
NK Karlovac players
Turan-Tovuz IK players
NK Krk players
NK Nehaj players
NK Opatija players
First Football League (Croatia) players
Croatian Football League players
Kategoria Superiore players
Azerbaijan Premier League players
Croatian expatriate footballers
Expatriate footballers in Albania
Croatian expatriate sportspeople in Albania
Expatriate footballers in Azerbaijan
Croatian expatriate sportspeople in Azerbaijan